The Sukanya-class patrol vessels are large, offshore patrol craft in active service with the Indian Navy. Three lead ships were built by Korea Tacoma, now part of Hanjin Group. Vessels of the Sukanya class are named after notable women from Indian epics.

Description
The Sukanya class have large hulls, although they are lightly armed since they are utilized primarily for offshore patrol of India's exclusive economic zone. However, they are capable of being heavily armed and upgraded to light frigates should the need arise. Two vessels of the class,  and  have been used as test beds for installation of the Dhanush ship-based ballistic missile launch system. This includes the stabilization platform for enabling the ships to launch the missiles in stormy conditions.

 was sold to Sri Lanka and renamed . She was the former flagship of the Sri Lanka Navy and obtained several remarkable naval victories against the naval branch (Sea Tigers) of the Tamil Tiger rebels.

Ships of the class

Operators
- Total 7 ships constructed in this class. One ship sold to Sri Lanka navy. 6 ships remain in active service.
 – 1 ship purchased from Indian navy.

See also
List of active Indian Navy ships
List of Sri Lanka Navy equipment

References

 
Patrol ship classes